Saint Sophia Cathedral  is a Catholic church that serves as the principal church of the Roman Catholic Diocese of Kyiv-Zhytomyr, Ukraine. 
The temple was built between 1746 and 1748 and was founded by Bishop Samuel Jan Ozga.

After a fire in 1768, the church was converted into a Classical-style three-nave building. The church is now an eclectic building with a preserved Baroque interior.
In Soviet times, it was closed to the faithful for several years, and the priests were arrested and sent to labor camps.

After 1991, after the Fall of Communism, the cathedral was restored and enlarged.

See also
Roman Catholicism in Ukraine

References

External links
St. Sophia Cathedral in Zhytomyr<

Roman Catholic cathedrals in Ukraine
Buildings and structures in Zhytomyr
Roman Catholic churches completed in 1748
18th-century Roman Catholic church buildings in Ukraine